Frankie Celenza is a chef and television personality.

Early life and education
Celenza was born in New York. He graduated from Kent School in 2005 and New York University Tisch School of the Arts in 2009.

Career
Celenza is the producer and host of the show Frankie Cooks on NYC Life. He has created many videos on YouTube and Tastemade. His programs have received New York Emmy Awards in 2013 and 2014. His show Struggle Meals is a cooking show for those on a budget and is produced with Tastemade.

In 2021, he hosted the first season of Frankie vs the Internet, another Tastemade production, in which chefs compete to create meals inspired by on online culinary trends.

In June 2022, Celenza won the Daytime Emmy Award for Outstanding Lifestyle/Culinary Show Host for Struggle Meals.

References

External links

Frankie Celenza at Tastemade
Frankie Celenza on YouTube

1986 births
Living people
Celenza_Frankie
Celenza_Frankie
American YouTubers
Kent School alumni
Tisch School of the Arts alumni
Chefs from New York City